Kovai Kondattam is a water theme park situated 2 kilometers from Perur Temple on Siruvani Main Road at a distance of 8.5 km from the city. The major attractions are Wave Pool, Family Pool, Kids' Pool, Water Slides, Water Falls, Dashing Cars, Family Train, Giant Wheel, Chair-O-Plane, Aqua Dance Pirate Ship, Merry-go-round etc.

References 

Amusement parks in Tamil Nadu
Buildings and structures in Coimbatore
Tourist attractions in Coimbatore
Year of establishment missing